Fournierella is the scientific name of two genera of organisms and may refer to:

Fournierella (bacterium), a genus of bacteria in the family Oscillospiraceae
Fournierella (cephalopod), a genus of ammonites